Tocantins  is one of the 26 states of Brazil. It is the newest state, formed in 1988 and encompassing what had formerly been the northern two-fifths of the state of Goiás. Construction of its capital, Palmas, began in 1989; most of the other cities in the state date to the Portuguese colonial period. With the exception of Araguaína, there are few other cities with a significant population in the state. The government has invested in a new capital, a major hydropower dam, railroads and related infrastructure to develop this primarily agricultural area. The state has 0.75% of the Brazilian population and is responsible for 0.5% of the Brazilian GDP.

Tocantins has attracted hundreds of thousands of new residents, primarily to Palmas. It is building on its hydropower resources. The Araguaia and Tocantins rivers drain the largest watershed that lies entirely inside Brazilian territory. The Rio Tocantins has been dammed for hydropower, creating a large reservoir that has become a center of recreation. Because it is in the central zone of the country, Tocantins has characteristics of the Amazon Basin, and also semi-open pastures, known as cerrado. The Bananal Island (Ilha do Bananal), in the southwest of the State, is the second largest fluvial island in the world. There, the rivers create oases in the dry landscape, attracting many ecotourists to the region.

Etymology 
The name "Tocantins" refers to the Tocantins River, which itself derives from the Tupi language words tukã´, "toucan", and tï, "beak", literally "Toucan's beak".

Geography 

The geography of Tocantins is varied. It straddles both the Amazon rainforest and the coastal savanna. Many rivers (including the Tocantins River) traverse the state. Researchers have identified more than 20 archaeologically significant sites related to indigenous cultures.

Tocantins is bordered to the northeast by the states of Maranhão and Piauí, Bahia to the east, Goiás to the south, Mato Grosso to the west, and Pará to the northwest. Tocantins was created from the northern two-fifths of Goiás state in 1989 and is divided into 139 municipalities.

Following its separation from Goiás, the new state was transferred from Brazil's Central-West Region to the North Region.

Climate 

Most of Tocantins (except the extreme western and northern regions) is situated within a vast Brazilian area known as the cerrado. The cerrado region's typical climate is hot and semi-humid, with pronounced seasonal variation marked by a dry winter from May through October. The annual rainfall is around 800 to 1600 mm.

Vegetation 

The "cerrado" landscape cover 87% of Tocantins and is characterized by extensive savanna formations crossed by gallery forests and stream valleys. Cerrado includes various types of vegetation. Humid fields and "buriti" palm paths are found where the water table is near the surface. Alpine pastures occur at higher altitudes and mesophytic forests on more fertile soils. In the north of Tocantins the cerrado gives place to a zone of transition for the Amazon biome, near Tocantins River.

The savanna formations are not homogenous. There is great variation between the amount of woody and herbaceous vegetation, forming a gradient from completely open "cerrado" — open fields dominated by grasses — to the closed, forest-like "cerrado" and the "cerradão" ("big cerrado"), a closed canopy forest. Intermediate forms include the dirty field, the "cerrado" field, and the "cerrado" sensu stricto, according to a growing density of trees.

The "cerrado" trees have characteristic twisted trunks covered by a thick bark, and leaves that are usually broad and rigid. Many herbaceous plants have extensive roots to store water and nutrients. The plant's thick bark and roots serve as adaptations for the periodic fires which sweep the cerrado landscape. The adaptations protect the plants from destruction and make them capable of sprouting again after the fire.

As in many savannas in the world, the "cerrado" ecosystems have been coexisting with fire since ancient times. Initially they developed adaptations to natural fires caused by lightning or volcanic activity, and later to those caused by man.

Along the western boundary of the state is the floodplain of the Araguaia River, which includes extensive wetlands and Amazon tropical forest ecosystems. Bananal Island, formed by two branches of the Araguaia, is said to be the largest river island in the world. It consists mostly of marshlands and seasonally flooded savannas, with gallery forest.  Where the two branches meet again they form an inland delta called Cantão, a typical Amazonian igapó flooded forest.  The Araguaia is also one of the main links between the Amazonian lowlands and the Pantanal wetlands to the south, but the river is not fully navigable.

Protected areas

Araguaia National Park, established in 1959, is located on Bananal Island. It borders Cantão State Park, and together, these strictly protected areas form the core of the Araguaia Mosaic of Protected Areas, which consists of over four million hectares of state and federal protected areas and Indian lands along the Araguaia wetlands. The mosaic also extends into the neighboring states of Pará and Mato Grosso.

Nascentes do Rio Parnaíba National Park is located on the opposite corner of the state, in the transition zone between the Cerrado and the semi-arid Caatinga. It also extends into the neighboring states of Maranhão and Piauí.

In addition, the State of Tocantins has established state parks at Jalapão and Serra do Lajeado, protecting two unique samples of the Cerrado. The state parks and protected areas of Tocantins are managed by Naturatins, the state environmental agency.

History 

Portuguese Jesuit missionaries explored what is today Tocantins state about 1625, seeking to convert the Amerindian peoples of the area to Christianity. The area is named after the Tocantins River, whose name is derived from an indigenous language. (From: Tukô, Toucan +  tï, beak. lit. "Toucan's beak" in Tupi language.)

Before 1988 the area made up the northern two-fifths or one-third of Goiás state. Since the 17th century, this area was relatively isolated by rivers navigable only in short portions and mountains, and difficult to access. As a result, the southern area of the state became more developed, particularly after this area was selected in 1956 as the site for the development of the new capital of Brasília and the Federal District. A strong separatist movement developed in the north for independence of its people.

After the government levied heavy taxes on mining in 1809, local residents began to organize a separatists movement. They made a minor revolt which was quickly crushed by the army. In the 19th century, a string of failed uprisings occurred in the north. Historically the area was inhabited chiefly by Amerindians in some intact indigenous tribes and pardos of Amerindian and Portuguese descent.

In the 1970s, the population of northern Goiás lobbied the government to establish a separate state. In the 1988 Constitution, the State of Tocantins was created and admitted as a new Brazilian state.

Since its establishment and investment by the government, as in the new capital of Palmas, Tocantins has been the fastest-growing Brazilian state. Its thriving economy is based on agriculture and agro-industry, attracting thousands of migrants from all over the country. The construction of the long-planned North–South Railway will probably boost economic growth even more.

Demographics 
According to the IBGE, as of 2014, there were 1,496,880 people residing in the state.

Urbanization: 71.5% (2004); Population growth: 2.6% (1991–2000); Houses: 355,502 (2005).

The last PNAD (National Survey of Households) census revealed the following numbers: 948,000 Pardos (brown, multiracial) people (68.9%), 330,000 White people (24.0%), 95,000 Black people (6.9%), 2,000 Asian or Amerindian people (0.2%).

Largest cities

Education 

Portuguese is the official national language, and thus the primary language taught in schools. But English and Spanish are part of the official high school curriculum.

Educational institutions
 Universidade Federal do Tocantins (UFT) (Federal University of Tocantins);
 Universidade Estadual do Tocantins (Unitins) (State University of Tocantins);
 Instituto Federal do Tocantins (IFTO) (Federal Institute of Tocantins)
 Escola Técnica Federal de Palmas (ETF-TO);
 Faculdade de Tecnologia de Palmas (FTP);
 Fundação Unirg (Unirg) (Foundation Unirg);
 and many others.

Economy 

The service sector is the largest component of GDP at 59.9%, followed by the industrial sector at 27.2%. Agriculture represents 12.9% of GDP (2004). Tocantins exports: soybean 89.2%, beef 10.5% (2002). Tocantins' economy is based on an aggressive expansionist model of agro-exports and is marked by consecutive records of primary hyper-surpluses: its exports reveal its strong agricultural inclination. Following the example of neighboring states (Mato Grosso and Goiás), it is becoming a major grain producer (soy, corn, rice).

As with much of Brazil, Tocantins' economy is also dependent on cattle ranching. The state's pineapple plantations is considerable. In the state's north, charcoal and oils are extracted from the babaçu palm tree.

Share of the Brazilian economy: 0.4% (2005).

The Gross Value of the state's agricultural production was estimated at more than R$ 7.6 billion in 2019.

In soy, Tocantins is the largest producer in the northern region of Brazil. In the 2019 harvest, Tocantins harvested 3 million tons. 

In maize, the state harvested close to 1 million tonnes in 2019. 

In 2019 Tocantins was the leader in rice production in the North region, becoming the 3rd largest producer in Brazil. Harvested more than 670 thousand tons in the 2016/2017 harvest.

Regarding pineapple, in 2018 Tocantins was the 6th largest producer state in Brazil, with 69 million fruits.

In 2019 the state's cattle herd was 8 million animals. 

About industry, Tocantins had an industrial GDP of R$ 4.5 billion in 2017, equivalent to 0.4% of the national industry. It employs 30,234 workers in the industry. The main industrial sectors are: Construction (34.1%), Industrial Services of Public Utility, such as Electricity and Water (28.4%), Food (22.5%), Non-metallic minerals (5.2%) and Chemicals (1.5%). These 5 sectors concentrate 91.7% of the state's industry. 

Its industry is mainly agroindustry, centralized in six districts located in five pole cities: Palmas, Araguaína, Gurupi, Porto Nacional and Paraíso do Tocantins. Its industry is still small and focused mainly on domestic consumption.

In the tertiary sector (commerce and services), its main activities are concentrated in the capital Palmas and also in the cities that are located on the side of the Belém-Brasília Highway (BR-153 and BR-226). This highway is vital for Tocantins, as it cuts the state from north to south and allows for a better performance in the economic growth of the cities located on its banks, serving as a warehouse for road transport and services for travelers. In addition, the Belém-Brasília Highway also facilitates the flow of production from Tocantins to other states and to ports on the coast.

Infrastructure

Palmas Airport 

The facility occupies one of Brazil's largest airport sites and has a privileged location near the Lajeado Hydroelectric Station.
Designed with a modern concept of visual communication, the new Palmas Airport Complex contains an Aeroshopping area. This is part of a program developed by Infraero, to develop Brazil's main airports as commercial centers with their own brand and identity.

The passenger terminal has 12.300 square meters of constructed area and capacity to serve up to 370 thousand people a year. It has a food court, cultural space, shops, panoramic deck, elevators, and air conditioning. The runway can receive aircraft the size of a Boeing 767. Three taxiways and aprons are reserved for general aviation, making operations more flexible. The airport's full infrastructure includes a control tower and installations for the Air Navigation Group, fire brigade, a covered equipment parking area, canteen and training rooms, two aircraft fueling stations, a gate with electronic entry control, guard booths, parking and flight protection buildings, besides a 4 km (2.48 mi) access road linking the airport to the Tocantins capital city's main thoroughfare.

Federal highways 
BR-153 (One of the two main highways of the state, also known as Belém–Brasília Highway)
BR-226 (One of the two main highways of the state, also known as Belém–Brasília Highway)
BR-010
BR-230 (also known as Trans-Amazonian Highway)
BR-235
BR-242

Flag 
The message of the flag is the phrase "where the sun rises for all". In the middle of the flag is the golden yellow sun, with its rays symbolically targeting to the future of the state. The sun is placed on a white band, where the white color represents peace. The blue in the upper left and the yellow in the bottom right represent the waters and the soil of the state. The colors date back to a flag used by the Autonomous Government of Palmas in the 19th century.

The flag was adopted with the state flag law (law no 094/89) of November 17, 1989.

Cities 

Tocantins contains 139 municipalities. For statistical purposes, the Brazilian Institute of Geography and Statistics (IBGE) divides the state into two mesoregions containing eight micro-regions. These statistical divisions were revised in 2017.

Important cities include:
 Tocantinópolis
 Colinas do Tocantins
 Araguaína
 Gurupi
 Palmas, capital of the state
 Dianópolis
 Porto Nacional

Represented in popular culture
Survivor: Tocantins was the setting for the eighteenth season of the United States reality show Survivor, filmed in the microregion of Jalapão in Tocantins. The premiere aired February 12, 2009.

Footnotes

References

External links

 Government of Tocantins website
 Legislative Assembly of Tocantins website

 
States of Brazil

States and territories established in 1988
1988 establishments in Brazil